Many Happy Returns is a 1934 American pre-Code Paramount Pictures comedy film directed by Norman Z. McLeod and starring Gracie Allen, George Burns, and George Barbier.

Plot

Cast
Gracie Allen as herself 	
George Burns as himself
George Barbier as Horatio Allen
Joan Marsh as Florence Allen
Ray Milland as Ted Lambert
Stanley Fields as Joe
William Demarest as Brinker
Johnny Arthur as Davis
Franklin Pangborn as Allen's Secretary
Egon Brecher as Dr. Otto von Strudel
Jack Mulhall as actor
Morgan Wallace as Nathan Silas
Kenneth Thomson as Motion Picture Director
Guy Lombardo as himself
Veloz and Yolanda as specialty dancers

References

External links

1934 films
American comedy films
1934 comedy films
Films directed by Norman Z. McLeod
Paramount Pictures films
American black-and-white films
1930s American films